The Wych Elm cultivar Ulmus glabra 'Luteo Variegata' was first described by Richard Weston in The Universal Botanist and Nurseryman (1770) as "the gold-striped broad-leaved wych elm". 

See also Ulmus glabra 'Latifolia Aureo-Variegata'.

Description
Weston described the tree simply as having leaves variegated with yellow.

Cultivation
No specimens are known to survive. The tree is not known to be in commerce, nor to have been introduced to North America or Australasia.

References

Wych elm cultivar
Ulmus articles missing images
Ulmus